Old Believers Church in Foļvarka is an Old Believers place of worship in Foļvarka, in the Aglona municipality, Latvia.

Its building began in 1894 and the church was incepted in 1910. During the World War II, Germans wanted to take down the church bell, but locals prevented it by giving away their money and jewelry. In the 1970s, Foļvarka church was robbed several times and from the 162 icons there is left only one. Since 2013, the church is one of the national architectural monuments of Latvia.

References

Old Believer movement
Old Believer churches in Latvia
Buildings and structures completed in 1894
Russian Revival architecture
Buildings and structures in Latvia